Doleschallia is a genus of butterflies of the subfamily Nymphalinae in the family Nymphalidae. With their wings closed Doleschallia resemble dead leaves. Another Indo-Australian genus Kallima, and the African genera Kamilla, Mallika and Kallimoides are collectively known as dead leaf butterflies. They have a pronounced wing apex, and the hindwing tornus is extended and forms a short tail. This shape, together with the dead-leaf colouration, complete with a "midrib", and markings which resemble patches of mould and leaf galls gives the butterfly a remarkable resemblance to an attached or fallen dead leaf.

Species and subspecies
Listed alphabetically:
 Doleschallia bisaltide (Cramer, [1777]) – autumn leaf
Doleschallia bisaltide bisaltide
Doleschallia bisaltide apameia Fruhstorfer
Doleschallia bisaltide australis C. & R. Felder, 1867
Doleschallia bisaltide cethega Fruhstorfer
Doleschallia bisaltide ceylonica Fruhstorfer – Sri Lanka
Doleschallia bisaltide continentalis Fruhstorfer, 1899
Doleschallia bisaltide denisi (Viette 1950) – New Caledonia
Doleschallia bisaltide gurelca Grose-Smith
Doleschallia bisaltide herrichi Butler – New Hebrides
Doleschallia bisaltide indica Moore, 1899
Doleschallia bisaltide menexema Fruhstorfer
Doleschallia bisaltide montrouzieri Butler – New Hebrides
Doleschallia bisaltide nasica Fruhstorfer, 1907
Doleschallia bisaltide nigromarginata Joicey and Noakes, 1915
Doleschallia bisaltide philippines Fruhstorfer
Doleschallia bisaltide polibete (Cramer, [1779])
Doleschallia bisaltide pratipa C. & R. Felder, 1860
Doleschallia bisaltide rennellensis Howarth
Doleschallia bisaltide scapus Fruhstorfer
Doleschallia bisaltide sciron Godman & Salvin
Doleschallia bisaltide siamensis Fruhstorfer, 1912
Doleschallia bisaltide tenimberensis Fruhstorfer
Doleschallia bisaltide tualensis Fruhstorfer
 Doleschallia browni Salvin & Godman, 1877
Doleschallia browni browni
Doleschallia browni scotina Fruhstorfer, 1912
Doleschallia comrii Godman & Salvin, 1878 – Fergusson Island
 Doleschallia dascon Godman & Salvin, 1880 – New Guinea
Doleschallia dascon dascan
Doleschallia dascon dasconides Fruhstorfer, 1903New Guinea
Doleschallia dascylus Godman & Salvin, 1880
Doleschallia dascylus dascylus
Doleschallia dascylus anicetus Fruhstorfer, 1915
Doleschallia dascylus endascylus Fruhstorfer, 1903
Doleschallia dascylus phalinus Fruhstorfer, 1907
 Doleschallia hexophthalmos (Gmelin, 1790) – New Guinea, Moluccas
Doleschallia hexophthalmos hexophthalmos
Doleschallia hexophthalmos areus Fruhstorfer, 1907
Doleschallia hexophthalmos donus Fruhstorfer, 1915
Doleschallia hexophthalmos gaius Fruhstorfer, 1912
Doleschallia hexophthalmos kapaurensis Fruhstorfer, 1899
Doleschallia hexophthalmos solus Fruhstorfer, 1912
Doleschallia hexophthalmos varus Fruhstorfer, 1912
 Doleschallia melana Staudinger, 1886 – Moluccas
 Doleschallia nacar  (Boisduval, 1832)
Doleschallia nacar nacar
Doleschallia nacar trachelus Fruhstorfer, 1907
 Doleschallia noorna Grose-Smith & Kirby, 1893
Doleschallia noorna noorna
Doleschallia noorna antimia Fruhstorfer, 1912
Doleschallia noorna demetria Fruhstorfer, 1912
Doleschallia noorna fulva Joicey & Noakes, 1915
Doleschallia noorna lyncurion Fruhstorfer, 1912
 Doleschallia polibete (Cramer, [1779])
Doleschallia polibete celebensis Fruhstorfer, 1899 – Sulawesi, Talaud, Togian, Salayar, Buton, Galla, Kalao
Doleschallia polibete sulaensis Fruhstorfer, 1899 – Sula
Doleschallia polibete maturitas Tsukada, 1985
 Doleschallia rickardi Grose-Smith, 1890
Doleschallia rickardi rickardi – New Britain
Doleschallia rickardi pfeili Honrath, 1892 – New Ireland
 Doleschallia tongana Hopkins, 1927 – Polynesia and Melanesia
Doleschallia tongana tongana
Doleschallia tongana vomana Fruhstorfer – Fiji

References

External links
Images representing Doleschallia at Consortium for the Barcode of Life

Kallimini
Butterfly genera
Taxa named by Baron Cajetan von Felder
Taxa named by Rudolf Felder